Gregory Ephimovich Shchurovsky (30 January 1803 – March 20, 1884) was a Russian Professor of geology in Moscow.

Life
Shchurovsky was born in Moscow in 1803. He ended up in an orphanage because his father was killed in 1812 and his mother, Maria Gerassimovna, could not afford to keep him. He took his surname to honour a benefactor. He attended university in Moscow where he studied a new course of geology.

In 1863 he led the Society of Devotees of Natural Science, Anthropology, and Ethnography. Together with other leading members of the society discussed having a museum. Their first move in this direction was to establish a library. In 1871 Moscow council set aside half a million roubles to create a museum. A committee was formed with Grand Duke Konstantin Nikolayevich as honorary chair. The formation of a museum was timely as Peter the Great's 200th anniversary would inspire an exhibition that would be used to launch the new Polytechnic Museum.

He travelled extensively around the growing Russian empire writing about people and rocks.

He died in 1884 and in the same year, August Yulevich Davidov became president of the Society of Devotees of Natural Science, Anthropology, and Ethnography.

Memory 
 In honor of G. E. Shchurovsky in 1871 Alexei Fedchenko named the glacier and the peak on the Pamir-Alai in Turkestan Range (in the Matches).

Fossil organisms:
 Parallelodon schourovskii  - species of bivalve molluscs, Upper Jurassic of the European part of Russia.
 Stschurovskya  - genus of cephalopods, Upper Jurassic of the southeast of the European part of Russia.
 Laugeites stchurovskii  - a cephalopod species, Upper Jurassic of the European part of Russia.

In 1882, botanists Regel and Schmalh. published Schtschurowskia, which is a genus of flowering plants from Central Asia belonging to the family Apiaceae and named in Gregory Shchurovsky's honour.

References

1804 births
1884 deaths
Scientists from Moscow
Russian geologists